
Year 475 BC was a year of the pre-Julian Roman calendar. In the Roman Republic, it was known as year 279 Ab urbe condita. The denomination 475 BC for this year has been used since the early medieval period, when the Anno Domini calendar era became the prevalent method in Europe for naming years.

Events

By place

Greece 
 Cimon leads an Athenian attack on the island of Skyros and expels the indigenous inhabitants who are regarded as pirates.
 The first recorded eruption of Mount Etna occurs.

China 
 Zhou Yuan Wang becomes king of the Zhou Dynasty.

By topic

Arts 
 The painter Polygnotus of Thasos begins his work (approximate date).

Births

Deaths 
 Heraclitus of Ephesus, Greek philosopher (b. c. 535 BC)
 Duke Ding of Jin, ruler of Jin in ancient China (r. 511–475 BC)

References